This page documents notable heat waves worldwide in 2022. Many heat waves were worsened by climate change and its effects. Notably, heat waves across Europe, which also affected the United Kingdom, started in June and continued throughout July into August. They caused continent-wide wildfires, with thousands dying due to heat-related causes. Other heat waves have been felt throughout the year, including in the Americas, China, Australia and the Indian subcontinent.

January
 January 10–16: The Southern Cone had a severe heatwave. Argentina, Uruguay, Paraguay and certain parts of Brazil experienced extreme temperatures, with Argentina suffering the worse impacts. According to WMO it affected water, energy supply, and agriculture. Buenos Aires reached  and over 700,000 people lost power there. Parts of the country reached .
 January 14: In Australia, in the town of Onslow, the temperature hit . If verified, the temperature would be tied as the highest in the Southern Hemisphere.
Perth had eleven days of temperatures over  during the 2021-2022 summer, topping the previous record of seven days recorded in 2016–2017.

February
 February 8–13: Multiple cities in central and southern California, including San Francisco, Sacramento, Los Angeles, and San Diego experienced a record-breaking heat wave. San Francisco recorded  on February 10, an all-time record for the city for meteorological winter. Palm Springs recorded  on February 11.

March–April
 Starting in late March India and Pakistan began experiencing one of the hottest March–April periods on record. At least 90 people were killed by the heat wave; 25 in India and 65 in Pakistan.
 In early March, a strong heatwave affected Northern Australia, and in particular North Queensland, with the city of Townsville equalling or beating the previous March minimum temperature record 5 times in one week.

May 
 A major heat wave affecting the United States started in May. Three residents in a senior building died on May 14 in Chicago due to the intense heat, because the air conditioning would not turn on.

June
A historic heat wave affected the Midwestern United States and Southeastern United States in the second week of June 2022. This forced over 125 million people under excessive heat warnings. Following a brief respite June 18, the heat wave returned into the following days. In Odessa, Texas, thousands of residents were left without water as temperatures reached . In Chicago, Midway Airport recorded three days with high temperatures of at least  between June 14 and June 21.
 Heat waves affecting Europe began in June. The Spanish heat wave began on 12 June.
 On 29 June 2022, Japan saw the worst heatwave in 150 years.

July

 China has suffered several heat waves, starting 5 July. According to the China Meteorological Administration, Turpan is expected to reach  between 25 and 31 July.
 A heat wave beginning on 8 July in the United Kingdom saw the first red extreme heat warning to ever be issued in the country, causing it to be declared a national emergency on 15 July. An unconfirmed report from the Met Office on 19 July indicated a new record temperature for the United Kingdom, . This is the first time the temperature exceeded  in the United Kingdom.
 On 13 July in Tunis, the capital city of Tunisia, the temperature reached 48 degrees Celsius (118 degrees Fahrenheit), fanning the flames of devastating wildfires. 
An intense, fatal heat swept through the United States in July. More than 100 million people were put on heat alerts, and over 85% of the country had temperatures at or above . This extreme heat severely intensified drought conditions. Arkansas and Missouri went from 1% and 2% of their states from seeing severe drought or worse, to a quarter and a third. Temperatures in Abilene, Texas on July 20 hit , breaking a daily record. Daily record high low temperature records were set, like in Needles, California, where the temperature never dipped below  on July 20. Record warm low temperatures were also set in Galveston, Witchita Falls, Houston and Laredo, on July 20. The heat wave was responsible for 18 other deaths, including 12 in Maricopa County, Arizona and one at Badlands National Park. Witchita Falls hit  on July 20, a record for July, while on that day Oklahoma also reached that mark. Joe Biden is using the heat wave to show how serious of an issue climate change is.

August
Another heat wave moved across the United States in early August. In early August, a heat wave forced 80 million Americans under heat alerts. This led to a ten day long heat wave in Philadelphia, while Boston saw temperatures above  for six days in a row. Due to this, the New York Metropolitan Area had a top 5 hottest August, and Islip, New York and Newark, New Jersey had their warmest on record, and so did Philadelphia a little bit to the southwest. Further west, Missoula, Montana saw their hottest August on record. August, like July, was the warmest for daily minimums. Oregon, Washington, Idaho, New Jersey, Connecticut, Rhode Island, Massachusetts and New Hampshire had their warmest August on record. In addition, Newark set a record for the most days above  in August.

September
On September 1, Death Valley hit  a global record for September. There were two deaths- one each in Arizona and Idaho. Fairfield, CA hit  on Sept. 6.

November
 A record breaking November heat waves shatters records across the Eastern United States on November 5–7. On November 6,Burlington, Vermont reached , the warmest so late in the year. Atlanta hit , which tied for the hottest temperature so late in the year. Harlingen, Texas hit  which also tied for the hottest so late in the year.

Impacts and measures
As record-breaking heatwaves and droughts affected water supplies, rivers (along with shipping and nuclear reactor cooling), ecosystems, various global supply chains, health, and agriculture worldwide, in Europe, Spain domestically restricted e.g. air conditioning to defined temperature ranges, in the U.S., entities were required to provide plans to reduce their water usage, and China experienced large blackouts and experimented with cloud seeding among other measures, despite experts stating it would be "marginally effective" and possibly exacerbate problems. Several journalists of online newspapers have put these extreme weather events into the context of climate change adaptation (alongside highlighting of the importance of climate change mitigation).

See also

Weather of 2022
2021 heat waves

References

29.^Lehoullier,Jack (6 September 2022) California and the West broil in record-setting heat wave - NPR. "Retrieved 13 September 2022."

2022-related lists
Weather-related lists